The King's Pirate is a 1967 American pirate film directed by Don Weis and starring Doug McClure, Jill St. John and Guy Stockwell. It is a remake of the 1952 film Against All Flags.

Plot
A British naval officer volunteers for a dangerous mission to infiltrate the base of pirates who threaten shipping off Madagascar.

Cast
 Doug McClure as Lt. Brian Fleming 
 Jill St. John as Mistress Jessica Stephens 
 Guy Stockwell as John Avery
 Mary Ann Mobley as Princess Patna 
 Kurt Kasznar as Zucco 
 Richard Deacon as Swaine 
 Torin Thatcher as Captain Cullen 
 Diana Chesney as Molvina MacGregor 
 Ivor Barry as Cloudsly 
 William Glover as Captain Hornsby (as Bill Glover)
 Woodrow Parfrey as Gow 
 Sean McClory as Sparkes 
 Émile Genest as Captain Mission 
 Ted de Corsia as Capt. McTigue
 Alex Montoya as Caraccioli
 Tanya Lemani as Member of Zucco's Troop
 Ami Luce as Member of Zucco's Troop 
 Bob Terhune as Member of Zucco's Troop (as Robert Terhune)
 Chuck Couch as Member of Zucco's Troop
 Bill Couch as Member of Zucco's Troop (as William J. Couch)
 Loren Janes as Member of Zucco's Troop 
 Henry Monzello as Member of Zucco's Troop (as Hank Monzello)
 William R. Snyder as Member of Zucco's Troop (as William Snyder)
 Rodney Hoeltzel as Member of Zucco's Troop
 Danny Rees as Member of Zucco's Troop

Production
Paul Wayne rewrote the script for Against All Flags adding some new characters, notably Zucco (played by Kurt Kaznar). Doug McClure was making The Virginian at the time but was written out of the show to allow him to make the movie. Filming started late October 1966.

Female lead Jill St John was under contract to Universal at the time. It was her sixth picture that year after Fame is the Name of the Game, How I Spent My Summer Vacation, The Liquidator, Eight on a Lam, and Banning. She took fencing lessons for the role. Filming ended in December.

See also
List of American films of 1967

References

External links

1967 films
Films directed by Don Weis
Films set in Madagascar
Films set in the 1700s
Pirate films
Remakes of American films
Universal Pictures films
1960s historical adventure films
American historical adventure films
1960s English-language films
1960s American films